Kutaisi State Scientific Universal Library is a library in Kutaisi, Georgia.

See also 
 Ilia Chavchavadze

References 

Libraries in Georgia (country)
Buildings and structures in Kutaisi